Paul Nicholas Ayers  (b September 1961) has been Archdeacon of Leeds since  2017.

Ayers was educated at St Peter's College, Oxford and Trinity College, Bristol. He was ordained in 1986. 
His posts up to 2017 were
 1985-88: Curate St John the Baptist, Clayton, West Yorkshire 
 1988-91: Curate, St Andrew, Keighley
 1991-1997: Vicar St Cuthbert, Wrose
 1997-2017:Vicar, SS Laurence & Paul, Pudsey

References

1961 births
Clergy from Winchester
Living people
Alumni of St Peter's College, Oxford
Alumni of Trinity College, Bristol
Archdeacons of Leeds